The Great Good Place is a book by Ray Oldenburg, originally published in 1989. More recent reprints have occurred in 1997 and 1999.  While "Cafes, Coffee Shops, Community Centers, General Stores, Bars, Hangouts, and How They Get You through the Day" was the original subtitle, the more recent reprints of this work use the new subtitle "Cafés, Coffee Shops, Bookstores, Bars, Hair Salons and Other Hangouts at the Heart of a Community."

Third places 

Oldenburg suggests that for a healthy existence, citizens must live in a balance of three realms: home life, the workplace, and the inclusively sociable places.  Other cultures such as the French have their rendezvous term to describe this third realm, though as the American English language has no vocabulary to describe this third realm, Oldenburg adopts the accepted term third place to describe these locations throughout the book.

Other than the numerous personal benefits third places offer their regulars, Oldenburg advocates for the immense social value they bring and points out their historical role, amongst others:
 The American tavern in the American Revolution
 The French café in the French Revolution
 The London coffee house during the Enlightenment
 The agora in Greek democracy

The largest causes underlined in the passing of third places are urban planning practices and suburban development.  If the deterioration of American community is to be addressed, the third place may be a solution in reframing the way interpersonal interaction is approached on an individual level.

Contents (1999 reprint)

Part I 

1. The Problem of Place in America
2. The Character of Third Places
3. The Personal Benefits
4. The Greater Good

Part II 

5. The German-American Lager Beer Gardens
6. Main Street
7. The English Pub
8. The French Café
9. The American Tavern
10. Classic Coffeehouses

Part III 

11. A Hostile Habitat
12. The Sexes and the Third Place
13. Shutting Out Youth
14. Toward Better Times... and Places

Sources
(New York: Paragon House, 1989) 

1989 non-fiction books
Sociology books
Category:Da Capo Press books